Marmaduke William Deane (25 March 1857 – 7 November 1936) was an English first-class cricketer. Deane was a right-handed batsman who played primarily as a wicketkeeper.

Deane made his first-class debut for Surrey in 1880 against Nottinghamshire. This was Deane's only appearance for Surrey.

In the 1895 County Championship, Deane made his debut for Hampshire against Derbyshire. Deane played for the club four times during the 1895 season, with his final first-class match coming against Essex. Behind the stumps, Deane took six catches and made four stumpings.

Deane died at Dorking, Surrey on 7 November 1936.

External links
William Deane at Cricinfo
William Deane at CricketArchive

1857 births
1936 deaths
Cricketers from Greater London
English cricketers
Hampshire cricketers
People from Richmond, London
Surrey cricketers
Wicket-keepers